Anatoly Kondratenko (Russian: Анатолий Кондратенко, Ukrainian: Анатолій Кіндратенко; 6 December 1935, Leningrad, Soviet Union) is a Professor of Physics at University of Kharkiv. A theoretical physicist who has been working in the field of plasma and plasma electronics for over 50 years, Kondratenko has written over 270 papers. Under his supervision, 24 PhD and 7 Doctor of Science dissertations have been written Kondratenko, along with his students and co-authors, pioneered the study of the electrodynamics of plasma waveguides. He explained from a theoretical point of view the existence of surface ion acoustic waves, cyclotron waves and eigen waves on the plasma-metal interface. In addition to this, he laid the groundwork for the theory of plasma electronics.

Kondratenko received his undergraduate degree in Theoretical physics in 1958 in the former Soviet Union (University of Kharkiv). He obtained his PhD (1965) and his Doctor of Science degree (1971) at UFTI, Kharkiv. His work has been featured in numerous newspaper and magazine articles in the United States, Europe, Ukraine, the Soviet Union and in many popular books.

Kondratenko took and continues to take part in the political life of Ukraine. He was a principal member of the Kharkiv chapter of Rukh in the 1990s, and continues to co-chair the chapter. He is also the head editor of the all-Ukrainian children's newspaper "Zhuravlik".

Books

References

1935 births
Living people
Scientists from Kharkiv
Soviet physicists
Theoretical physicists
20th-century Ukrainian physicists
National University of Kharkiv alumni
Academic staff of the National University of Kharkiv
School of Physics and Technology of University of Kharkiv alumni